Whitton may refer to:

People
 Whitton (singer-songwriter), American singer-songwriter
 Whitton (EP), 2010
 Charlotte Whitton (1896–1975), Canadian feminist and Mayor of Ottawa
 David Whitton (born 1952), Scottish politician
 Donald Whitton (born 1923), Canadian cellist, and teacher
 Evan Whitton, (1928–2018) Australian journalist
 Geoff Whitton (born 1942), Australian rules footballer 
 Ivo Whitton (1893–1967), Australian golfer
 John Whitton (1820–1898), Australian rail engineer
 Margaret Whitton (1949–2016), American actress
 Michael Whitton, American film director
Nicola Whitton (born 1972), British academic and author
 Steve Whitton (born 1960), English footballer
 Tiffany Whitton, (born 1987), American woman missing since 2013

Places

Australia
 Whitton, New South Wales

United Kingdom
 Whitton, Scottish Borders, a location in Scotland

England 
 Whitton, County Durham
 Whitton, Herefordshire, a location
 Whitton, Lincolnshire
 Whitton, London
 Whitton, Northumberland, a location
 Whitton, Shropshire
 Whitton, Ipswich, Suffolk, a suburb
 Whitton, Mid Suffolk, Suffolk, a civil parish
 Whitton, Lowestoft, an estate of Lowestoft, Suffolk

Wales 
 Whitton, Powys

United States
 Whitton, Arkansas, an unincorporated community
 Whitton, California, name prior to 1911 of Planada, California
 Whitton, Illinois, an unincorporated community
 Whitton, Texas, an unincorporated community